The following is a list of churches in Gloucestershire, England.

Gloucester
Catholic
St Peter's Church, Gloucester
English Martyrs RC Church
Church of England
St Barnabas Church, Gloucester
St Georges Church, Gloucester
St James Church, Quedgeley
St Nicholas Church, Hardwicke
St Paul and St Stephen's Church, Gloucester
St Owen's Church, Gloucester

Other:
One Church Gloucester, Banbury Road - Pentecostal
Gloucester Pentecostal Church, Matson, GL46LA

Cheltenham

Church of England parish churches 
(Diocese of Gloucester) (not a complete list)
Cheltenham Minster (previously St Mary's) — the original church of the town and the only surviving medieval building.
St Philip and St James Church, Leckhampton (liberal) — part of the South Cheltenham mission area.
Trinity Church (evangelical) — one of the largest Anglican congregations outside London.
 St Matthew's - Clarence St.
 Christ Church - Christchurch
 St Mark's - St. Marks
 All Saints - Pittville Circus
 St Luke's - Sanford
 St Peter's - The Moors
 St Paul's - St. Pauls
 St Andrew's - Montpellier
 St Christopher's - Warden Hill
 St Nicolas' - Wymans Brook
 St Stephen's - Tivoli
 St Mary's - Prestbury
 Holy Apostles - Charlton Park
 St Peter's - Leckhampton
 St Lawrence - Swindon Village

Other denominations 
St. Gregory's Church, Cheltenham - RC
 Sacred Hearts - RC, Charlton Kings
 Thomas More's - Hesters Way
 St. Mark's - Methodist
 Bethesda - Montpelier
 Charlton Kings Baptist - Baptist
Gloucester Pentecostal Church-Malayalam

Tewkesbury
 Tewkesbury Abbey

Cirencester
Church of St. John the Baptist, Cirencester

Stroud
The Immaculate Conception Catholic Church - RC

References

Gloucestershire
Churches